Rivière Témiscamie Water Aerodrome  is located on Temiscamie River, Quebec, Canada.

See also
 Rivière Témiscamie (Air Roberval Ltée) Aerodrome

References

Registered aerodromes in Nord-du-Québec
Seaplane bases in Quebec